SING*ularity  (also known as OperaWorks) is an independent documentary film produced and directed by Brad Mays, and co-produced by Lorenda Starfelt at LightSong Films in North Hollywood.

Deriving its title from Shakespeare's Twelfth Night - "put thyself into the trick of singularity" - SING*ularity portrays the unique training approach of OperaWorks, an intense training program in Northridge, California for opera singers founded by Ann Baltz in which the entire body is engaged. This rigorous approach to tuning the "total instrument" is rooted in various avant-garde techniques common to theatre training, but unique to the world of classical music.

The film follows a group of singers - both student and professional - through the entire course, where they are instructed in Yoga, movement, visualization, conducting, acting and, of course, given traditional vocal coaching. The singers are also taught to improvise arias in a manner not unlike the scat approach used by jazz vocalists.

References

External links 
 OperaWorks Official Website
 Turner Classic Movies (TCM) page for SING*ularity
 

2009 films
American independent films
Documentary films about opera
Films shot in Los Angeles
Films directed by Brad Mays
2000s English-language films
2000s American films